ONE: Only the Brave was a Combat sport event produced by ONE Championship that took place on January 28, 2022, at the Singapore Indoor Stadium in Kallang, Singapore.

Background
The main event was set to feature an interim Heavyweight title fight between the Russian Anatoly Malykhin and the Belarusian Kiril Grishenko was expected to take place at the event. However, the bout was moved to this event ONE: Bad Blood due to Malykhin tested positive for COVID-19 days before the event.

The event also featured the semi finals for the ONE Kickboxing Featherweight Grand Prix.

Françesco Xhaja made his promotional debut against the veteran Rade Opacic.

A Lightweight bout between Zhang Lipeng and Ruslan Emilbek Uulu was scheduled for the event.

A featherweight bout between Kim Jae Woong and Tang Kai was expected to take place at this event. However, Kim withdraw before the event due to undisclosed medical issue and the bout was moved to this event ONE X.

Results

Bonus awards
The following fighters received $50,000 bonuses.
Performance of the Night: Chingiz Allazov, Rade Opačić and Zhang Lipeng.

See also 

 2022 in ONE Championship
 List of ONE Championship events
 List of current ONE fighters

References 

Events in Singapore
ONE Championship events
2022 in mixed martial arts
Mixed martial arts in Singapore
Sports competitions in Singapore
January 2022 sports events in Singapore